Ethyl lauroyl arginate (LAE) is a food preservative more commonly known as E243.

It has chemical formula C20H40N4O3 and is a drug for dermatological disorders.

Periodontal diseases 
LAE has potential in treating gingivitis, and the more advanced periodontitis. In a study comparing ethyl lauroyl arginate in 0.147% mouthwash to chlorhexidine (CHX) 0.12% as an adjunctive therapy in the non-surgical treatment of periodontitis, the results showed there were no treatment-related adverse events. Total bacterial count and the specific pathogens were reduced at 4 weeks and 3 months by both mouthwashes with no statistical differences between them at neither periods of time. It was concluded that 0.147% LAE-containing mouthwash could be an alternative to the use of 0.12% CHX in the non-surgical therapy of periodontitis considering the similar clinical effects, more stable microbiological improvement and absence of adverse effects.

It is sold as the main active ingredient in Listerine Advanced Defence Gum Treatment and as one of the active ingredients in GUM Activital Mouthwash.

References

E-number additives
Dermatologic drugs
Amino acid derivatives